The President Joseph R. Biden, Jr. Expressway, commonly referred to as the President Biden Expressway, and formerly known as the Central Scranton Expressway, is a short freeway southeast of downtown Scranton in the U.S. state of Pennsylvania. It runs east-southeast from U.S. Route 11 (US 11)/Pennsylvania Route 307 (PA 307) near downtown to Interstate 81 (I-81).

The highway is one of only two freeways in Pennsylvania with no posted route number; the other is the Airport Connector near Harrisburg. In the Location Referencing System, it is designated State Route 3022 by the Pennsylvania Department of Transportation (PennDOT). In 2021, the road was renamed after President Joe Biden, who was born in Scranton.

Route description
The President Biden Expressway begins at an interchange with US 11/PA 307 and Cedar Avenue in Scranton, with access to northbound US 11/PA 307 and from southbound US 11/PA 307. From here, the President Biden Expressway heads east-southeast as a four-lane freeway. The road runs between residential neighborhoods to the southwest and Roaring Brook to the northeast. The freeway passes under the Harrison Avenue Bridge before ending at a directional T interchange with I-81.

History
Construction began in 1964 alongside the adjacent section of I-81. The road was built along a portion of the former Lackawanna and Wyoming Valley Railroad right-of-way passing beneath the Harrison Avenue Bridge. It opened with a temporary western terminus feeding into Front Street at Prospect Avenue. By the early 1970s, the current interchange at the western terminus was opened, connecting to a new road replacing the demolished Spruce Street Bridge. In July 2021, there was a proposal to rename the Central Scranton Expressway after incumbent U.S. President Joe Biden, who was born in Scranton. On July 20, 2021, the Scranton City Council unanimously voted to rename the Central Scranton Expressway to the President Joseph R. Biden Jr. Expressway along with renaming Spruce Street to Biden Street. PennDOT replaced signage on the northbound lanes of I-81 on September 29, 2021, and replaced signage on the southbound lanes of I-81 on the following day. The sign installation was completed on October 4, 2021, at the exit 185 off ramp along I-81.

Exit list

References

See also

North Scranton Expressway

Limited-access roads in Pennsylvania
Transportation in Lackawanna County, Pennsylvania
1964 establishments in Pennsylvania
Freeways in the United States
Biden